The 1931 South Dakota Coyotes football team was an American football team that represented the University of South Dakota in the North Central Conference (NCC) during the 1931 college football season. In its first season under head coach Stanley G. Backman, the team compiled a 2–5 record (1–3 against NCC opponents), tied for last place in the NCC, and was outscored opponents by a total of 148 to 55. The team played its home games at Inman Field in Vermillion, South Dakota.

Schedule

References

South Dakota
South Dakota Coyotes football seasons
South Dakota Coyotes football